The 2013 China Open was held from September 18 to 24 in Tianjin, China.

The Canadian representatives, Team McEwen, won the men's event, defeating China's Liu Rui 6–5 in the event final. The team, consisting of Mike McEwen, B. J. Neufeld, Matt Wozniak and Denni Neufeld topped the round robin with a 6–1 record, only losing one game to Sweden's Oskar Eriksson. They then beat Scotland's Logan Gray to advance to the final where they faced China's Liu. The Canadian team led the game early 4–1 before the Chinese tied it up at five all after eight. Following a blank in the ninth end, the McEwen rink scored one in the tenth end to secure the victory.

On the women's side, South Korea's Team Kim defeated Canada's Team Carey 9–6 in the final. The team, with Kim Ji-sun, Gim Un-chi, Shin Mi-sung and Lee Seul-bee just narrowly qualified for the playoffs. After a 3–4 round robin record, the team from Gyeonggi-do beat the Chinese Jiang Yilun rink 9–6 in a tiebreaker to qualify. They then beat the undefeated Wang Bingyu Chinese rink 8–7 in the semifinal before taking on the Chelsea Carey rink in the final. After a tight first half, steals in ends six, seven and eight ultimately led to the Korean team's victory.

Men

Teams

The teams are listed as follows:

Round-robin standings
Final round-robin standings

Round-robin results 
All draw times are listed in China Standard Time (UTC+08:00).

Draw 1
Thursday, September 19, 2:00 pm

Draw 2
Friday, September 20, 9:30 am

Draw 3
Friday, September 20, 6:30 pm

Draw 4
Saturday, September 21, 2:00 pm

Draw 5
Sunday, September 22, 9:30 am

Draw 6
Sunday, September 22, 6:30 pm

Draw 7
Monday, September 23, 2:00 pm

Tiebreaker
Monday, September 23, 6:30 pm

Playoffs

Source:

Semifinals
Tuesday, September 24, 9:30 am

Bronze medal game
Tuesday, September 24, 2:30 pm

Final
Tuesday, September 24, 2:30 pm

Women

Teams

The teams are listed as follows:

Round-robin standings
Final round-robin standings

Round-robin results 
All draw times are listed in China Standard Time (UTC+08:00).

Draw 1
Thursday, September 19, 9:30 am

Draw 2
Thursday, September 19, 6:30 pm

Draw 3
Friday, September 20, 2:00 pm

Draw 4
Saturday, September 21, 9:30 am

Draw 5
Saturday, September 21, 6:30 pm

Draw 6
Sunday, September 22, 2:00 pm

Draw 7
Monday, September 23, 9:30 am

Tiebreaker
Monday, September 23, 6:30 pm

Playoffs

Source:

Semifinals
Tuesday, September 24, 9:30 am

Bronze medal game
Tuesday, September 24, 2:30 pm

Final
Tuesday, September 24, 2:30 pm

References

External links
Men's Event
Women's Event

2013 in curling
September 2013 sports events in China
International curling competitions hosted by China
Sports competitions in Tianjin